Vasil Kirkov (born 13 March 1999) is a Bulgarian-born American professional tennis player.

Kirkov has a career high ATP singles ranking of 570 achieved on 16 March 2020. He also has a career high ATP doubles ranking of 515 achieved on 5 November 2018.

Kirkov made his Grand Slam main draw debut at the 2017 US Open after receiving a wild card for winning the under-18 boys championship with Danny Thomas.

External links
 
 

1999 births
American male tennis players
American people of Bulgarian descent
Living people
People from Asenovgrad
Tennis players from Tampa, Florida